Om Shanti Om (transl. Peace Be With You) is a 2007 Indian Hindi-language fantasy romance film written and directed by Farah Khan, co-written by Mayur Puri and Mushtaq Shiekh, and produced by Gauri Khan under the banner of Red Chillies Entertainment. Spanning three decades, the film stars Shah Rukh Khan as Om Prakash Makhija, a poor junior film artist in 1977, who falls in love with a secretly-married film actress Shantipriya, portrayed by debutante Deepika Padukone. Her husband and a film producer Mukesh Mehra, played by Arjun Rampal, betrays her and murders her in a fire. Om witnesses this and is severely injured while trying to rescue her, resulting in his death as well. Being reborn as rich superstar Om Kapoor in 2007, he sets out to seek revenge from Mukesh with the help of Shanti's doppelganger Sandy Bansal. Shreyas Talpade and Kirron Kher appear in the film as well and cameos from many Bollywood celebrities are seen in several sequences and songs.

Farah conceived the film while directing the musical Bombay Dreams (2002), which was based on the Indian film industry. After Shah Rukh rejected the first version of her next film Happy New Year, she was reminded of Om Shanti Om; the film's title derives from a similar titled popular song from Subhash Ghai's popular film Karz (1980) which starred Rishi Kapoor as the main protagonist. The soundtrack album was composed by Vishal–Shekhar, with lyrics written by Javed Akhtar. The background score was performed by Sandeep Chowta. The album was a critical and commercial success, becoming the highest-selling album of the year in India.

Om Shanti Om released on 9 November 2007 on the occasion of the festival of Diwali, earning ₹149 crore worldwide, thus becoming the highest grossing Hindi film of 2007, in addition to becoming the highest-grossing Hindi film ever at the time of its release. It received positive reviews from critics upon release, with praise for its story, screenplay, soundtrack, production design, costumes and performances of the cast.

At the 55th National Film Awards, Om Shanti Om won Best Production Design (Sabu Cyril). At the 53rd Filmfare Awards, it received a leading 13 nominations, including Best Film, Best Director (Farah), Best Actor (Shah Rukh), Best Actress (Padukone) and Best Supporting Actor (Talpade), and won 2 awards – Best Female Debut (Padukone) and Best Special Effects.

Plot

1977 

Om Prakash Makhija is a poor young boy who is a junior film artist in Bollywood and lives with his widowed mother Bela Makhija and close friend Pappu Master in a small chawl in Mumbai. He is in love with Shantipriya, a beautiful young woman who is a popular film actress in Bollywood. Om often expresses his feelings before Shanti's film poster and desires to meet her.

One night, he sneaks into the premiere of one of her films "Dreamy Girl" along with Pappu in disguise. Later that night, a drunk Om gives an emotional speech to Pappu as he dreams of becoming a great actor. Om and Pappu take small acting roles in films which are filmed at R.C. Studios, a major filming compound owned by Mukesh Mehra, a charming but egotistical person who is a wealthy and famous film producer.

While shooting one day, Shanti gets trapped in a fire that grows out of control during filming. Risking his life, Om jumps into the fire and rescues her. Shanti is grateful towards him, and the two become friends. Om lies to Shanti that he is a famous South-Indian actor to impress her. He even puts an act of the filming of his South-Indian film, but ultimately tells Shanti the truth of him being a small-time junior actor upon seeing her genuine fondness for him.

Shanti forgives Om and they spend a happy evening with each other, and she gifts him a snow globe. However, things take a turn when Om accidentally ends up overhearing a heated conversation between Shanti and Mukesh. He is shocked to discover that they have been married for two years but have not revealed it in public as that will ruin both of their careers. Shanti reveals to Mukesh that she is also pregnant with his child, leaving Om heartbroken. He avoids Shanti entirely.

The next night, Mukesh takes Shanti to the set of her upcoming film titled Om Shanti Om and tells her that they will cancel its production and have a grand marriage ceremony over there. Om reaches there to meet Shanti for the last time and return her snow globe but is dejected upon seeing her with Mukesh. He leaves from there and throws the snow globe in a fountain pond nearby. 

Meanwhile, Mukesh tells Shanti that his marriage with Shanti and the unborn child will destroy his successful career. In order to prevent that, he sets fire to the set and locks a horrified Shanti in it, in order to kill her and the unborn child. As he exits the set, Om spots Shanti in the flames and attempts to go and rescue her but is attacked by Mukesh's guards, leaving him severely injured. After they leave, he manages to enter the set but is thrown out of the building by a big explosion. Om staggers on the road as the set burns down with Shanti in it.

Om is left devastated upon witnessing this and suddenly gets hit by the car of renowned actor Rajesh Kapoor. He takes him to a hospital with his pregnant wife Lovely Kapoor who is under labor. The serious injuries of Om result in his death while still reminiscing about Shanti.  Rajesh's assistant Nasser asks his surgeon to keep this a secret from Bela and Pappu. Moments later, Rajesh and Lovely are blessed with a baby boy, and they name him Om Kapoor.

2007 

30 years later, Om Kapoor is shown as a rich young man who is a superstar in Bollywood and is revealed to be the rebirth of Om Prakash Makhija. He experiences Pyrophobia and often comes across Bela who believes him to be her son and tries to take him to her house. An aged Pappu tries to make her understand that he is someone else but she pays no heed to him. Om also ignores her and leaves upon thinking that she has gone crazy. 

He and his assistant Anwar Sheikh subsequently drive to the abandoned R.C. Studios for the filming of one of Om's films. Om recognizes the place and experiences some flashbacks of his previous life. He even finds Shanti's broken snow globe and is confused. That night, Om remembers the emotional speech he had given to Pappu in a drunken state when he wins the Filmfare Award for Best Actor. As he gives the same speech to the audience, Pappu watches his award function on TV and realizes that his friend is reborn as Om Kapoor. Meanwhile, a grand party is thrown for Om's success. Om remembers his whole previous life upon being visited by Mukesh, who now works in Hollywood and wishes to make a film with him.

Later that night, he traces Bela and Pappu to the crawl and has an emotional reunion with them. The three plan to avenge Shanti's death by making Mukesh confess his crime.

The next day, Om manages to convince Mukesh to resume the filming of Om Shanti Om at the same ruined R.C. Studios. He auditions several actresses to find Shanti's look-alike but in vain. However, Om ends up coming across Sandhya aka Sandy, a ditzy but lovely girl who is an exact doppelganger of Shanti. He hires her without revealing his plan and ends up firing her as she is unable to act properly. On Pappu's advice, Om reveals his plan to Sandy who promises him that she will help him according to his plan. 

At the inaugural ceremony of the Om Shanti Om set, Bela scares Mukesh in the disguise of an old witch, and Om and Pappu try to light Shanti's photograph on fire to remind him of his crime. Although the setup doesn't work, the photograph is supernaturally lit by fire which disturbs Mukesh and confuses Om and Pappu. Mukesh is more horrified when Sandy appears in front of him dressed as Shanti in a make-up room. Eventually, he decides to leave for America after seeing Shanti in the footage of Om Shanti Om but Om asks him to wait for some days. He eventually performs the story of Shanti's life through a song in front of Mukesh during the music launch of Om Shanti Om. However, Mukesh discovers Sandy's real identity as her body bleeds due to an injury. Mukesh attempts to chase her but is knocked unconscious by a falling chandelier. 

After he regains consciousness, Om confronts him over his crime but Mukesh taunts him that he or his "duplicate Shanti" cannot convict him for the murder as there is no proof for it. Just then, Sandy reaches the scene. She reveals that after the fire in the set died down, Mukesh returned to the place. Shanti was still alive then, but he buried her alive under the chandelier. She concludes that Shanti's corpse will be found under the chandelier, which will be proof of her murder for the court. Mukesh denies her revelation and attempts to shoot her but Om attacks him and a fire breaks out on the set. He shoots him in his leg and is about to murder him but Sandy stops him, saying that Mukesh is destined to die but not in his hands. She looks at the chandelier which falls and strikes Mukesh dead. 

The next moment, Om is shocked when Pappu and Anwar reach the scene along with "Sandy". As he glances back at the one in front of him, he realizes that the one who had revealed the proof of Shanti's murder and killed Mukesh was the real Shanti, a.k.a. the ghost of Shanti. She was responsible for lighting the photograph with fire and knocking Mukesh unconscious too, helping him in his plan. Om reunites with Sandy and waves at Shanti who tearfully smiles at him and disappears, having finally attained peace.

The film ends with all its cast and crew approaching the set of Om Shanti Om and the credits roll.

Cast 
 Shah Rukh Khan as Om Prakash Makhija and Om Kapoor "O.K." (dual role)
 Deepika Padukone as Shantipriya and Sandhya "Sandy" Bansal (dual role)
 Shreyas Talpade as Pappu Master (Om Makhija's friend)
 Kirron Kher as Bela Makhija (Om Makhija's mother)
 Arjun Rampal as Mukesh "Mike" Mehra (Shanti's husband)
 Javed Sheikh as Rajesh Kapoor (Om Kapoor's father)
 Asavari Joshi as Lovely Kapoor (Om Kapoor's mother)
 Yuvika Chaudhary as Dolly Arora (Om Kapoor's heroine in the movie-within-a-movie Om Shanti Om)
 Bindu Desai as Kamini Arora (Dolly's mother)
 Nitesh Pandey as Anwar Sheikh (Om Kapoor's assistant)
 Vishal Dadlani (director of Mohabbat Man)
 Haresh Hingorani as Faizan ‘F’ Khan (director of Om Shanti Om)
 Naseer Abdullah as Naseer (Rajesh's assistant)
 Suresh Chatwal as Suresh (Om Makhija's friend)
 Manikandan Velayutham as the director of Mind It
 Mayur Puri as Director of Apahij Pyar
 Sanjiv Chawla as Producer of Apahij Pyar
 Priya Patil as Natasha (Om Kapoor's heroine in Apahij Pyar)
 Vikram Sahu as Om Kapoor's doctor
 Suhas Khandke as Om Makhija's surgeon
 Sharad as Mukesh's guard
 Yaseen as Mukesh's guard
 Farah Khan as the woman who makes fun of Om Makhija

Cameo appearances 
 Subhash Ghai
 Rishi Kapoor
 Akshay Kumar
 Abhishek Bachchan
 Satish Shah as Partho Roy (film director)
 Karan Johar
 Aarti Gupta Surendranath
 Malaika Arora Khan (Om Kapoor's heroine in Mohabbat Man)

(in alphabetical order)
 Amitabh Bachchan
 Ameesha Patel (Om Kapoor's heroine in Phir Bhi Dil Hai N.R.I.)
 Bipasha Basu
 Bappi Lahiri
 Chunky Pandey
 Dia Mirza (Om Kapoor's heroine in Main Bhi Hoon Na)
 Feroz Khan
 Hrithik Roshan
 Karisma Kapoor
 Koena Mitra
 Preity Zinta
 Rakesh Roshan
 Rani Mukerjee
 Sanjay Dutt
 Sanjay Kapoor (uncredited)
 Shabana Azmi
 Yash Chopra

Special appearances during the "Deewangi Deewangi" song (in order of appearance) 

 Rani Mukerji  
 Zayed Khan
 Vidya Balan
 Jeetendra 
 Tusshar Kapoor
 Priyanka Chopra
 Shilpa Shetty
 Dharmendra
 Shabana Azmi
 Urmila Matondkar
 Karishma Kapoor
 Arbaaz Khan
 Malaika Arora
 Dino Morea
 Amrita Arora
 Juhi Chawla
 Aftab Shivdasani
 Tabu
 Govinda
 Mithun Chakraborty
 Kajol
 Bobby Deol
 Preity Zinta
 Rekha 
 Riteish Deshmukh
 Salman Khan
 Saif Ali Khan
 Sanjay Dutt
 Lara Dutta
 Suniel Shetty

Production

Development
In 2002, Farah Khan worked as a choreographer for the musical Bombay Dreams in London, which she felt presented a "clichéd and outdated version" of the Indian film industry. She thought that the musical would not be successful if released in India. She instead thought of a new story, writing her initial thoughts about the subject on Andrew Lloyd Webber's letterhead while staying in his house. Later in 2006, Farah began to work on her next project, which was tentatively titled Happy New Year. Amid speculations that Shah Rukh Khan would star in Happy New Year, the actor rejected the first draft of the film, upon which Farah's husband and editor Shirish Kunder reminded her of the story she had conceived while in London. Happy New Year, which was to mark Deepika Padukone's Hindi debut, was put on hiatus and revived more than 8 years later under the same title.

Farah completed writing the first script of Om Shanti Om within two weeks. She set the first half in the 1970s as she felt the Hindi films made during that period were much more influential than those made in other periods, particularly the 1980s, which she felt was a period when "the worst movies were made". She also included many references to the 1970s, which were also prevalent in films of that time. She said, "Everything in the first half is about the 70ssuch as the mother who overacts, mouthing clichéd dialogues. Then there are cabarets, badminton and other stuff popular during that era." Shah Rukh's costumes were designed by Karan Johar, while Manish Malhotra designed Padukone's costumes. The rest of the cast had their costumes designed by Sanjeev Mulchandani.

In addition to directing the film, Farah co-wrote the story with Mayur Puri and Mushtaq Shiekh. She was also the film's choreographer. Puri wrote the screenplay and dialogues. He completed the writing process in two months and rewrote the film's second half. Puri created the screenplay by writing his natural reaction to the characters as scenarios. He knew that despite being part of a crowd, junior artists do not want to be recognised as such, ruins their chances of landing a leading role in future. This was used in a sequence involving Shah Rukh and Talpade, who play junior artists. Puri blended different genres together in Om Shanti Om, which he felt was challenging. He used his personal memories from childhood for creating the 1970s. Shirish Kunder was the editor, while V. Manikandan was the cinematographer.

Sabu Cyril was the film's production designer. Sabu was first offered the Mani Ratnam-directed Guru (2007) at a time when Om Shanti Om was being planned, but ultimately chosen the latter due to his earlier commitment to Farah for her future project. Farah used two particular dialogues in the film: "When you want something badly, the whole universe conspires to give to you" and "In the end everything will be ok and if its not ok its not the end". These were used as Khan felt that it reflected her philosophy in her life. Farah stated that the film's opening scene was her most favourite in it. In 2008, Puri felt his most favourite dialogue from the ones he wrote would be the Filmfare Awards speech. The film's title derives from the eponymous song from the film  Karz (1980). Om is a Hindu mantra; Om Shanti Om roughly translates to "Peace Be With You".

The film opens with the grandeur shot of the most famous songs of Karz that is Om Shanti Om featuring Rishi Kapoor and SRK as a junior film artist standing in the crowd.

Casting 

Shah Rukh was cast as the lead; he gained six packs for a song sequence. He felt Om Shanti Om was a "happy film".

Farah was advised by Malaika Arora to cast Padukone as the female lead, who was suggested by Wendell Roddick, under whom Padukone was working. She was cast without a screen test. Khan felt that she was "a beautiful, classic Indian beauty" who fit the role of an actor of the 1970s. She was excited at the prospect of working with Shah Rukh and said, "I've grown up watching [Shah Rukh] and always admired him so much. To get to work with him ... is quite wonderful. It was also fantastic that Farah showed faith in my talent and cast me opposite him."

In preparation for her role, Padukone watched several films of actresses Helen and Hema Malini to study their body language. Her character was modelled after Malini and nicknamed Dreamy Girl after her the latter's nickname as Dream Girl. Rampal was approached by both Khan and Shah Rukh at the latter's New Year's Eve party. Rampal was initially reluctant to do the role as he felt it was "too evil" for someone like him. With persuasion from Shah Rukh, he agreed. Rampal wore a mustache in the film which was suggested by Shah Rukh. Shreyas Talpade played a supporting role as the best friend of Khan's character. After the release of Iqbal (2005) and completing the filming of Dor, Talpade, who attended the same gym as Khan, was called for a narration of what would be Om Shanti Om. He agreed to do the role.

Kirron Kher, Bindu and Javed Sheikh also appear in the film. 31 Bollywood film actors appeared in cameo appearances for the song "Deewangi Deewangi". Other actors were also supposed to play cameos, including Fardeen Khan, who was arrested in Dubai over a drug case. Dev Anand refused as he always played lead roles in his career. Madhuri Dixit refused due to the promotional activities of Aaja Nachle (2007). Ajay Devgn refused due to his friend Arjun Rampal playing the villainous role in the film. Dilip Kumar and Saira Banu didn't appear in the song, despite plans to include them. Amitabh Bachchan refused due to his Abhishek Bachchan's wedding to Aishwarya Rai, while Aamir Khan refused due to Taare Zameen Par (2007) on his pending editing. Khan had wanted the three Khans to appear together in a film. Rekha, who appears in the song, carried out 2 days of rehearsal for it. All those who appeared for the song received gifts, including a Blackberry phone and a Tag Heuer watch.

Principal photography
Om Shanti Om was made on a budget of ₹40 crore. The first scene to be filmed was one where Talpade's character tells Shah Rukh's character that he will be a hero; Shah Rukh was an hour late for filming. Farah was pregnant with triplets while filming and experienced difficulties while shooting, she would constantly vomit while directing the film. The film was shot entirely in sync sound; Farah dismissed rumours of Padukone's voice being dubbed. In 2015, however, Mona Ghosh Shetty admitted to have dubbed for Padukone in the film. The fake fight scene involving a stuffed tiger was inspired by a similar scene in the film Tarzan 303. Old cars owned by actors Rajesh Khanna and Hema Malini were used for filming for authenticity.

A number of references to real life was also filmed, including a scene in which Om rescues Shanti from a fire, which was a spoof of Sunil Dutt rescuing Nargis from a fire on the sets of Mother India (1957). For a shot involving a Filmfare Awards ceremony, Khan stood on the red carpet of an actual Filmfare Award ceremony and requested actors to dictate dialogues as she stated. The song "Deewangi Deewangi" was shot over a period of six days. The song "Dhoom Taana" has digitally altered guest appearances, which included Sunil Dutt from Amrapali (1966), Rajesh Khanna from Sachaa Jhutha (1970) and Jeetendra from Jay Vejay (1977). Farah wanted to film Shakira for filming a special appearance had made her commit a few days for the role. Due to the uncertainty of her dates, the idea was scrapped.

In February 2007, a filming schedule was completed in Film City. It was then reported that filming would move outdoors after Shah Rukh completed filming for Kaun Banega Crorepati. In October 2007, Abhishek Bachchan finished filming for his cameo appearance; he shot between 10 and 2 in the night for his screen time of about one and a half minutes. Filming of the last sequence and the end-credit song was done in Film City. Farah continued the tradition of featuring an end-credits song beginning with Main Hoon Na (2004).

Om Shanti Om was produced by Shah Rukh's wife Gauri Khan under their Red Chillies Entertainment banner. While Marching Ants handled the publicity design, Gauri was the presenter. Shyam Kaushal, Amar Shetty and Shah Rukh were the action directors. The film's final reel length was 4013.94 ft (1223.45 m).

Music

Initially, A. R. Rahman was signed in to compose original songs and background score for the film but he opted out after disagreements with T-Series as he wanted them to share the copyrights of music between him and the lyricist. The film score was composed by Sandeep Chowta while the original songs featured in Om Shanti Om were composed by the duo Vishal–Shekhar with lyrics by Javed Akhtar. One song was composed by Pyarelal of the Laxmikant-Pyarelal duo. The vocals are provided by KK, Sukhwinder Singh, Marianne, Nisha, Caralisa Monteiro, Shaan, Udit Narayan, Shreya Ghoshal, Sunidhi Chauhan, Rahul Saxena, Sonu Nigam, Rahat Fateh Ali Khan, Richa Sharma, Abhijeet Bhattacharya, DJ Aqeel, DJ G, Kiran Karnath, Jackie V, Nikhil Chinapa, DJ Nawed and Zoheb. They intended the soundtrack to be a tribute to the music of the 1960s and 1970s, while appealing to newer audiences at the same time. Trade reports predicted the album to be commercially successful. The soundtrack album of Om Shanti Om was released on 15 August 2007 on CD.

Pyarelal of the Laxmikant-Pyarelal duo guest composed the title Dhoom Taana. He had stopped composing after the death of his partner Laxmikant, but after Farah Khan requested a song as tribute to the music of the 70s and the 80s, he agreed at the insistence of his wife and daughter. The song was recorded with a 150-member-orchestra and traditional instruments like drums, tabla, dholak and dafli, a trademark of Laxmikant-Pyarelal. He used more than 40 different percussion instruments.

In a soundtrack review, Joginder Tuteja of Bollywood Hungama gave it four stars out of five and opines, "Om Shanti Om is easily one of the most complete scores by Vishal-Shekhar and Javed Akhtar." Sukanya Verma of Rediff.com also gave it four stars out of five, applauding the tracks but criticised the "Dark Side" mix. She concludes her review by writing, "Om Shanti Om is an out-and-out musical that captivates with its roaring polyphony and unabashed drama." Aakash Gandhi of Planet Bollywood gave a rating of 8.5 stars out of 10 and writes, "not only have [Vishal–Shekhar] proven themselves in terms of musical ingenuity and quality, they have shown us the confidence, the poise, and the ability to step up to the plate and hit a grand-slam when they're called upon to do so." He further gave them a "standing ovation". Writing for AllMusic, Bhaskar Gupta gave the album 4.5 stars out of five and praises the composers, writing, "Vishal-Shekhar finally delivered a soundtrack that could be deemed their signature offering."

Vishal–Shekhar was nominated for the Best Music Director at the 53rd Filmfare Awards, Producers Guild Awards 2008 and Zee Cine Awards 2008, winning for Best Composer at the 2nd Asian Film Awards. Vishal Dadlani was alone nominated for Best Lyrics for "Ajab Si" at the Filmfare and Producers Film Guild award ceremonies. Akhtar was nominated for Best Lyrics at the Filmfare and Zee Cine awards, winning at the 9th IIFA Awards for "Main Agar Kahoon". It was the highest-selling music album of the year in India, with sales of around 2 million units.

Release
Om Shanti Om created a record of sorts by going in for an unheard of 2000 prints (worldwide) release. This was the highest number of prints (including digital) for any Indian movie at the time of its release. Om Shanti Om set another record for registered pre-advance booking of 18,000 tickets in a chain of theatres in Delhi a few days before the advance booking was to start. A special screening was conducted for Bollywood actors. Red Chillies Entertainment had reportedly sold the world rights for the film to Eros International for an amount between Rs. 720–750 million. Baba Films, a production and distribution company, had offered a record Rs. 110 million for the rights to the Mumbai Circuit, surpassing the highest amount ever paid for the territory. As a marketing strategy, Amul advertised Shah Rukh.

Nina Davuluri's talent for Miss America 2014 was a Hindi Film fusion dance choreographed by Nakul Dev Mahajan and performed to Dhoom Taana. It was the first time Hindi Film ever appeared on the Miss America stage and Davuluri is the first Indian American to win the competition. Om Shanti Om was remade into a Japanese musical titled Oomu Shanti Oumu. A book, titled The Making of Om Shanti Om written by Mushtaq Sheikh, was released after the release of the film. The book gives an insight into the production and happenings behind the camera of the film.

Controversy
Manoj Kumar planned to sue the makers of Om Shanti Om for showing his body double in bad taste. Kumar added, "Are the Mumbai police so stupid that they can't recognise Manoj Kumar and lathicharge him in the '70s when he was a star?". Later, in a press conference, Shahrukh Khan and director Farah Khan accepted their mistake and apologised for the matter. Farah Khan even offered to cut the scene which Manoj Kumar felt was hurtful, but Kumar refused on grounds that, as Farah had stated, "I [Farah Khan] am like his daughter. He said, 'Betiyaan maafi nahi maangti' (Daughters don't ask for forgiveness). I told him that he could've called me and scolded me." Later, Kumar said that though this incident was hurtful to him, he wishes to forgive, ignore, and move on, saying that he prefers to "see Ram in everyone and ignore the Ravana."

Before the film's television premiere on Sony TV, Manoj Kumar filed for a stay on the television release, at civil court in Mumbai. On 8 August 2008, he won permanent injunction on the scenes in Om Shanti Om that lampooned him. The court ordered the producers and Sony Entertainment Television, to edit the Manoj Kumar look-alike scenes before showing the film on the channel on 10 August 2008. It also ordered that the film could not be shown in any media—TV, DVD or Internet—without the scene being deleted.

Plagiarism allegations
On 7 August 2008, before its television release, scriptwriter Ajay Monga moved the Bombay High Court alleging that the basic storyline of the film was lifted from a film script he had emailed to Shah Rukh Khan in 2006. According to the petition, "Monga, along with one more writer Hemant Hegde, had registered the script with the Cine Writers Association (CWA) in September 2005. In January 2008, Cine Writers Association (CWA) rejected Monga's appeal at a special Executive Committee meeting. Thereafter, he approached the court to stay the film's screening on television. Though, on 6 August the court rejected Monga's plea for seeking a stay on the television telecast, it directed all the respondents including Shahrukh Khan, Farah Khan, Red Chillies Entertainment, Gauri Khan (director Red Chillies) and film's co-writer Mushtaq Sheikh, to file their say by the next hearing on 29 September 2008. In November 2008, the Film Writers' association sent a communication to Red Chillies and Ajay Monga that it had found similarities in Om Shanti Om and Monga's script. The similarities were more than mere coincidences according to Sooni Taraporewala who chaired a special committee that has investigated the case on behalf of the Film Writers' association.

Another allegation of plagiarism came from Rinki Bhattacharya, daughter of late Bimal Roy, who directed Madhumati (1958). She threatened legal action against Red Chillies Entertainment and the producer-director of Om Shanti Om, as she felt that the film's second half was similar to Madhumati, also a rebirth saga.

Reception

Critical response

India
Om Shanti Om was received positively by Indian film critics. Taran Adarsh of Bollywood Hungama gave it four stars out of five and writes, "Om Shanti Om is Bollywood masala in its truest form and also, at its best" but notes, "the second half could've been crisper". Khalid Mohamed of Hindustan Times gave the film four stars out of five and appreciated the performances, observing how Rampal is "consistently first-rate as the suave villain" while Padukone is "fantastic, so surprisingly assured that you marvel at her poised debut". He notes that "the enterprise belongs to Shah Rukh Khan, who tackles comedy, high drama and action with his signature stylespontaneous and intuitively intelligent. Six-pack or no-packs, he's the entertainer of the year in this valentine to the movies."

Nikhat Kazmi of The Times of India gave the film three and a half stars out of five and writes, "Farah Khan's re-birth saga literally makes an art of retro and paints the seventies pop culture in Andy Warholish strokes". She called it an "unabashed tribute" to Karz. Raja Sen of Rediff.com gave it three and a half stars out of five and applauded the performances of Shah Rukh, Padukone and Talpade. He writes, "Om Shanti Om is an exultant, heady, joyous film reveling in Bollywood, and as at most parties where the bubbly flows free, there is much silly giggling and tremendous immaturity." He criticised the dialogues and excessive cameos in the film.

Rajeev Masand of News18 gave the film three stars out of five and writes, "Unpretentious and completely transparent in its intentions, Om Shanti Om is an entertainer in the true sense of the word, mixing up genre elements like comedy, drama, action and emotion to create a heady broth of Manmohan Desai-style exaggerated entertainment." He compliments the dialogues "which so cleverly incorporates Bollywood's oldest clichés into these characters' everyday parlance." A commentator for Indo-Asian News Service felt that Shah Rukh's acting was repetitive and writes, "He needs to curtail his unwarranted superstar mannerisms even in a total masala film like Om Shanti Om", while complimenting the performances of Padukone, Rampal and Talpade.

Sudish Kamnath of The Hindu stated that the film is "an unabashed celebration of willing suspension of disbelief, calling it a "light-hearted tribute to Hindi cinema the way we know it and love it". He praised the performances of Shah Rukh, Padukone and Talpade, while criticising Rampal and Kher. He also praised the various spoofs, especially the ones directed at Manoj Kumar, Sanjay Leela Bhansali and Abhishek Bachchan. Writing for SantaBanta.com, Subhash K. Jha gave it one star out of five and criticised the spoofs "which keeps swinging from homage to imitation with infuriating artifice", writing, "The mood is one of patronizing and condescension rather than genuine admiration for an era that's gone with the wind".

Overseas
On the review aggregator Rotten Tomatoes, Om Shanti Om holds an approval rating of 76%, based on 17 reviews with an average score of 7.21/10. Tajpal Rathore of BBC gave it 4 out of 5 stars as well and stated, "Both a homage to and parody of Hindi Films, this cinematic feast delivered straight from the heart of the film industry will have you glued to your seats till the end." Mark Medley of National Post gave 3 stars and stated, "The film is a mess for all the right reasons; elements of comedy, drama, romance, action and the supernatural are packed in. But really, the plot is just a vehicle to get from one song-and-dance number to the next." AOL gave the film 3 out of 5 stars stating, "The movie consists of all the elements that are essentially called the 'navratnas' of Indian cinema – from joy to grief to romance to revenge. And she mixes these well to cook up a potboiler, which is sure to be a runaway hit."

Box office 
Om Shanti Om opened across 878 cinemas in 2000 prints worldwide. The film collected $2.78 million in the United Kingdom, $3.6 million in North America, and $6,857,816 collectively from the rest of the world, which resulted in total overseas collections of $13,077,815, the fourth largest of all time as of 2010.

Home media 
In the United Kingdom, the film was watched by 750,000 viewers on Channel 4 in 2010. This made it the year's most-watched foreign-language film on UK television, above the Japanese anime film Spirited Away and German animated film The Little Polar Bear.

Awards and nominations

Further reading

Footnotes

References

External links

 
 
 
 
 

Red Chillies Entertainment films
2007 films
2000s Hindi-language films
Films about reincarnation
Indian ghost films
Paranormal films
Films directed by Farah Khan
Films involved in plagiarism controversies
Films about actors
Films scored by Vishal–Shekhar
Films whose production designer won the Best Production Design National Film Award
Films about Bollywood
Cultural depictions of actors
Cultural depictions of Rajesh Khanna